Bucculatrix mesoporphyra is a moth of the family Bucculatricidae. It is found in Australia. It was first described in 1933 by Alfred Jefferis Turner.

External links
Australian Faunal Directory

Bucculatricidae
Moths described in 1933
Taxa named by Alfred Jefferis Turner
Moths of Australia